Farhan Ayub (born 27 March 1985) is a Pakistani first-class cricketer who played for Hyderabad cricket team.

References

External links
 

1985 births
Living people
Pakistani cricketers
Hyderabad (Pakistan) cricketers
Cricketers from Hyderabad, Sindh